Amir Qizilbash (1943 – 2003) was a famous shayar (poet) and a film songs lyricist. He was born in Delhi, India in 1943 and died in 2003. He is well known for his lyrical work in Indian films Prem Rog (1982) and Ram Teri Ganga Maili (1985).

Popular songs
 Meri Qismet Mein Tu Nahin Shaaid, sung by Suresh Wadkar and Lata Mangeshkar, music of Laxmikant–Pyarelal in film Prem Rog (1982)
 Mein Hi Mein Hoon, sung by Suresh Wadkar, music by Ravindra Jain in film Ram Teri Ganga Maili (1985)

Poetry books
 Baaz Gasht (1974)
 Inkaar (1976)
 Shikayatein Meri (1979)
 Kulliyaat Amir Qazalbash (2006)

References

External links
Filmography of Amir Qazalbash as film song writer on IMDb website

1943 births
2003 deaths
People from Delhi
Indian Muslims
Indian lyricists
Urdu-language poets from India